Darrell J. Lewis (June 19, 1935 – April 19, 2020) was an American football player and coach. He played quarterback in college for the University of Pittsburgh Panthers football team.  Lewis was the head football coach at Waynesburg University in Waynesburg, Pennsylvania for five seasons, from 1968 until 1972.  His coaching record at Waynesburg was 20–25.

Lewis died on April 19, 2020.

Head coaching record

References

1935 births
2020 deaths
American dentists
American football quarterbacks
Pittsburgh Panthers football coaches
Pittsburgh Panthers football players
Waynesburg Yellow Jackets football coaches